Brandon Rozzell (born March 27, 1989) is an American professional basketball player. In 2017 he won the Swedish championship with Luleå where he was named the Finals MVP. In 2016 he was named the Basketligaen Most Valuable Player.

Professional career
In February 2012, Rozzell signed with Aris Leeuwarden of the Dutch Basketball League (DBL).

He played for Ferreteria Brenes Barva in 2014 and Escazu in 2015 in the Costa Rica LBS.

In 2016, he was named the Basketligaen Most Valuable Player after averaging 24.7 points and 5.8 assist for Svendborg Rabbits.

The following season, Rozzell moved to Luleå of the Basketligan where he won the Swedish championship in 2017 and was also named the Finals MVP.

In December 2018, Rozzell signed with Stjarnan of the Úrvalsdeild karla, where he was reunited with his former Svendborg Rabbits coach Arnar Guðjónsson. In his Úrvalsdeild debut, Rozzell scored 37 points in Stjarnan's 106–83 win against ÍR. On 17 February 2019, Rozzell scored 30 points in Stjarnan's 84–68 victory against Njarðvík in the Icelandic Cup finals. For his effort he was named the Cup Finals MVP.

In August 2019, Rozzell returned to BC Luleå. He averaged 21.6 points per game. On August 2, 2020, Rozzell signed with Keravnos of the Cyprus Basketball Division 1.

Titles, awards and achievements

Titles
Swedish League champion: 2017
Icelandic Cup: 2019

Awards
Danish League MVP: 2016
Swedish League Finals MVP 2017
Icelandic Cup MVP: 2019

Achievements
Úrvalsdeild karla scoring champion: 2019

References

External links
VCU Rams bio at vcuathletics.com
Profile at realgm.com
Icelandic statistics at Icelandic Basketball Federation

1989 births
Living people
American expatriate basketball people in Belgium
American expatriate basketball people in Denmark
American expatriate basketball people in the Netherlands
American expatriate basketball people in Sweden
American men's basketball players
Aris Leeuwarden players
Basketball players from Richmond, Virginia
Dutch Basketball League players
Okapi Aalstar players
Shooting guards
Stjarnan men's basketball players
Svendborg Rabbits players
Úrvalsdeild karla (basketball) players
VCU Rams men's basketball players